Eells is a surname. Notable people with the surname include:

Cushing Eells (1810–1893), American Congregational church missionary, farmer and teacher
James Eells (1926–2007), American mathematician
Paul Eells (1935–2006), American sportscaster
Richard Eells (1800-1846), American abolitionist and physician from Illinois
Samuel Eells (1810–1842), American lawyer, philosopher, essayist and orator